The women's discus throw at the 2009 World Championships in Athletics was held at the Olympic Stadium on August 19 and August 21.

Reigning Olympic champion Stephanie Brown Trafton was the favourite for the gold. She had set a career best and had the four longest throws of any athlete that season, although she had not competed since late June. Franka Dietzsch was another prominent performer: the 41-year-old was the defending champion and was making her 10th appearance of the tournament, but a weak season had underlined her waning powers. Cuban Yarelis Barrios looked set to build upon her World and Olympic silver medals from the last two years and Aimin Song had also performed well during the season. Veteran athletes Nicoleta Grasu and Natalya Sadova were also favoured to be among the top performers of the competition.

Chinese athletes led the qualification rounds with Ma Xuejun and Song topping their respective groups. Newcomers Żaneta Glanc and Dani Samuels rounded out the top four qualifiers. Dietzsch sole legal throw of the competition was not enough for qualification, leaving Nadine Müller as the only host competitor to make the final. Brown Trafton edged into the final, needed all three throws to take a best non-qualifier's position.

In the final, Grasu and Barrios quickly established themselves with marks of 65.20 m and 64.44 m, respectively, in the first two throws. Samuels, Glanc and Müller proved themselves on their third attempts, each throwing over 62 metres. Brown Trafton and Ma Xuejun both threw poorly and were among the four athletes eliminated after three throws. Personal bests of 64.76 and 65.44 m in the fourth and fifth round put Samuels in the lead. On the final throws, Song threw only enough to move up to fifth place, leader Grasu fouled but Barrios responded, although her mark of 65.31 m guaranteed her only second place.

Samuels was a surprise winner: at 19 years old, she was the youngest ever World discus champion, and she had progressed from Youth champion, to Junior winner, to the senior title in just four years. Barrios had matched her silver medal achievement at the 2008 Summer Olympics, and Grasu's bronze was her fourth medal in her career at the World Championships.

Medalists

Records

Qualification standards

Schedule

Results

Qualification
Qualification: Qualifying Performance 61.50 (Q) or at least 12 best performers (q) advance to the final.

Final

References
General
Discus throw results. IAAF. Retrieved on 2009-10-21.

Specific

Discus throw
Discus throw at the World Athletics Championships
2009 in women's athletics